Donald Grate (August 27, 1923 – November 22, 2014) was an American former professional baseball and pro basketball player. He played both Major League Baseball as a right-handed pitcher for the Philadelphia Phillies (seven games pitched over two seasons, 1945–1946) and NBA basketball as a small forward/shooting guard for the Sheboygan Redskins (two games played during the 1949–1950 season).

College career
Born in Greenfield, Ohio and nicknamed "Buckeye", Grate was a two-sport star at the Ohio State University, lettering in both baseball and basketball in the 1944 and 1945 seasons.  As a pitcher, he had career totals of 95 strikeouts and only 25 walks in just 89 innings pitched. In basketball Grate was a two-time all-Big Ten selection and earned All-America honors as a senior after scoring 272 points in 21 games. He was the captain of the 1944 team, leading the Buckeyes to a conference championship.  Grate was inducted into the Ohio State Varsity O Hall of Fame in 1996.

Professional baseball
In baseball Grate was known for his throwing arm, including throwing the ball .  He appeared with the Phillies during each of his first two pro seasons, splitting both 1945 and 1946 between the Phils and their Class A Eastern League farm club, the Utica Blue Sox. He was treated very roughly during his 1945 trial with Philadelphia, surrendering 16 runs, all earned, 18 hits, and 12 walks in 8 innings pitched over four appearances. He won 14 games for Utica in 1946, prompting a September call-up to the Majors, during which he was far more effective. He pitched three shutout innings of relief during his first two appearances, and was credited with his only MLB win on September 22 against the New York Giants at Shibe Park. In his final big-league game, six days later, he allowed only one run in five innings pitched, also against the Giants. In seven MLB games and 16 innings pitched, all in relief, Grate allowed 22 hits, 17 earned runs, and 14 bases on balls, with eight strikeouts. He had a long minor league career, playing for 13 seasons (1945–1957), winning 50 of 88 decisions as a pitcher and converting to an outfielder and third baseman in 1951 to take advantage of his skill as a hitter. He batted over .300 several times.

Professional basketball
In addition to his time playing baseball, Grate had also spent some time playing for the Indianapolis Kautskys for the National Basketball League. Grate later appeared in two games for the 1949–1950 Sheboygan Red Skins in the NBA, with one field goal and two points in six attempted shots.

Career statistics

NBA
Source

Regular season

References

External links

1923 births
2014 deaths
All-American college men's basketball players
Baseball players from Ohio
Basketball players from Ohio
Chattanooga Lookouts players
Dallas Eagles players
Hartford Chiefs players
Indianapolis Kautskys players
Louisville Colonels (minor league) players
Major League Baseball pitchers
Memphis Chickasaws players
Milwaukee Brewers (minor league) players
Minneapolis Millers (baseball) players
Ohio State Buckeyes baseball players
Ohio State Buckeyes men's basketball players
People from Greenfield, Ohio
Philadelphia Phillies players
Sheboygan Red Skins players
Utica Blue Sox players
American men's basketball players
Shooting guards
Small forwards